Tawatinaw is a hamlet in Alberta, Canada within Westlock County.

Demographics 

Amenities  
Tawatinaw Valley Alpine and Nordic Centre is a local destination for downhill and cross-country skiing. Spread over 140 acres, there are over 20 km of cross-country ski trails with views of the Tawatinaw Valley and Landing Trail.

Pine Valley Resort is located in the hamlet and offers a gymnastics centre and is destination for the surrounding rural communities in Northern Alberta. Pine Valley Resort also has a large hall that is often used for social gatherings and has accommodations on site.

See also 
List of communities in Alberta
List of designated places in Alberta
List of hamlets in Alberta

References 

Designated places in Alberta
Hamlets in Alberta
Westlock County